The Diocese of Oulu is a diocese within the Evangelical Lutheran Church of Finland. The diocese was first founded in the town of Kuopio in 1851, but the episcopal see was moved to Oulu in 1900.

Bishops 
Bishops of Kuopio
 1851–1884: Robert Frosterus
 1885–1897: Gustaf Johansson
 1897–1899: Otto Immanuel Colliander

Bishops of Oulu
 1900–1936: Juho Koskimies 
 1936–1943: Juho Mannermaa
 1943c: Yrjö Wallinmaa
 1943–1954: Väinö Malmivaara 
 1954–1963: Olavi Heliövaara
 1963–1965: Leonard Pietari Tapaninen 
 1965–1979: Kaarlo Johannes Leinonen
 1979–2000: Olavi Rimpiläinen 
 2001–2018: Samuel Salmi 
 2018–present: Jukka Keskitalo

See also
 Evangelical Lutheran Church of Finland

External links
 
 Diocese of Oulu 

Lutheran districts established in the 19th century
Oulu
Oulu